Xanthophyllum bicolor is a tree in the family Polygalaceae. The specific epithet  is from the Latin meaning "two-coloured", referring to the different colours of the leaf and petiole.

Description
The bark is dark brown and smooth. The flowers are yellowish-orange, drying to brown-orange.

Distribution and habitat
Xanthophyllum bicolor is endemic to Borneo. Its habitat is mixed dipterocarp forests at low altitude.

References

bicolor
Endemic flora of Borneo
Trees of Borneo
Plants described in 2005